was a noted Japanese sculptor of netsuke from Tanba Province. He was thus associated with the Tamba school. His works often depict animals. 

The Los Angeles County Museum of Art (LACMA) has an extensive collection of his works.

References

Bibliography 
Naito Toyomasa, Parts I & II by Kazutoyo Ichimichi

External links 

1773 births
1856 deaths
Netsuke-shi